Thomas Robert Flynn (born  June 2, 1936) is an American philosopher, Roman Catholic priest, and Samuel Candler Dobbs Professor at Emory University. He is a former president of the Metaphysical Society of America (2011).

Flynn was ordained in 1961, and studied at Columbia University.

References

20th-century American philosophers
20th-century American Roman Catholic priests
Philosophy academics
Presidents of the Metaphysical Society of America
Living people
1936 births